Rudi Swiegers (born August 31, 1987) is a Canadian retired pair skater. With previous partner Paige Lawrence, he is the 2011 Four Continents bronze medalist and a four-time Canadian national bronze medalist (2011–14). He later competed with Hayleigh Bell.

Personal life 
Swiegers was born in Cape Town, South Africa. His family moved to Canada for his mother, a physician, to work in Kipling, Saskatchewan. In 2009, he began studying part-time at Brandon University, focusing on psychology.

Skating career

Early years
Swiegers began skating at age ten in Saskatchewan and began pairs at age fifteen. In 2005, his first partner, Kristin Bonkowski, decided to focus on her singles career.

Partnership with Lawrence
In summer 2005, Swiegers teamed up with Paige Lawrence, one of few skaters at his club who jumped in the same direction –  clockwise.

Lawrence/Swiegers had a slow start in the junior ranks, placing 14th at Junior Nationals in 2006 and 2007. In 2008, however, they moved up to 2nd at the junior level and received several international assignments for the 2008–09 season. They were eighth and fifth at their two Junior Grand Prix assignments before finishing fourth at the 2009 World Junior Championships. They placed fourth on the senior level at Canadian Nationals.

In the 2009–10 season, the pair moved up to seniors. They were seventh at the NHK Trophy but dropped to sixth at Nationals, receiving no further assignments for the season.

Lawrence/Swiegers started the 2010–11 season at the 2010 Skate Canada International, where they won their first international medal, a bronze. They were fifth at the 2010 Cup of Russia. At the 2011 Canadian Nationals, they made several mistakes in the long program to finish in third place, their first podium finish at the event as seniors. They were named to the Canadian team for the 2011 Four Continents Championships. At the event, Swiegers was recognized as an example of good sportsmanship after lending his skate to Mark Ladwig during the short program. Ladwig's boot heel broke during his program and Swiegers, who had skated earlier in the day, quickly offered his own skate so that Ladwig and partner Amanda Evora could return to the ice to finish their program within the time allowed. Lawrence/Swiegers finished second in the short program and fourth in the free skate, with new personal best scores in both segments, and won the bronze medal. Swiegers later received a sportsmanship award from U.S. Figure Skating for his actions.

In late December 2011, Lawrence sustained a concussion in a training accident. The next month, the pair competed at the 2012 Canadian Championships, where they won their second national bronze medal.

Lawrence/Swiegers were named in Canada's team to the 2014 Winter Olympics in Sochi and finished 14th. The final event of their career was the 2014 World Championships in Saitama, Japan, where they placed 12th. They announced the end of their partnership on May 8, 2014.

Partnership with Bell
Swiegers teamed up with Hayleigh Bell in May 2015. They placed 5th in their international debut at the 2015 Skate Canada Autumn Classic and then 8th at a Grand Prix event, the 2015 Rostelecom Cup. On June 15, 2016, Swiegers and Bell announced their retirement on their Facebook page.

Programs

With Bell

With Lawrence

Competitive highlights

GP: Grand Prix; JGP: Junior Grand Prix

With Bell

With Lawrence

References

External links

 

1987 births
Canadian male pair skaters
Living people
Sportspeople from Cape Town
Canadian people of South African descent
Four Continents Figure Skating Championships medalists
Figure skaters at the 2014 Winter Olympics
Olympic figure skaters of Canada